Balkbrug is a village in the Dutch province of Overijssel. It is located in the municipality Hardenberg, about 5 km west of Dedemsvaart.

History 
Balkbrug is located where the road from Ommen splits into a road to Meppel and Leeuwarden, and a road to Hoogeveen and the city of Groningen. In 1599, a redoubt was constructed in Ommerschans, south of Balkbrug. It is named after a simple type of bridge. In 1819, a beggar's colony was founded to the south of the village. In 1840, it was home to 1,308 people. The church was built in 1896.

In 1893/94, the beggar's colony was turned into the state educational institution Veldzicht, a prison for young offenders. In 1911, it was enlarged and became the largest of the Netherlands. Nowadays, it is used as the forensic psychiatry centre.

Notable people 
 Nanno de Groot (1913–1963), American autodidact artist.

Gallery

References 

Populated places in Overijssel
Hardenberg